Wabma Kadarbu Mound Springs Conservation Park is a protected area in the Australian state of South Australia. The conservation park was proclaimed under the National Parks and Wildlife Act 1972 in 1996. As of 2012, it is subject to a co-management agreement between the Arabana aboriginal people and the Department for Environment and Water.

The name of the conservation park is derived from the Arabana language name used for the local feature also known as Hamilton Hill (also as Mount Hamilton) meaning "snake's head" in reference to the profile of Hamilton Hill.

The conservation park protects both a network of mound springs that upwell from the Great Artesian Basin and the "ruins of a fettler’s cottage at the old Margaret Rail Siding." Notable mound spring sites within the conservation park include "Pitha - Kurnti - Kurnti" at Coward Springs, "Thirrka" (also known as "Blanche Cup"), "Pirdali–nha" (also known as "The Bubbler"), and "Wabma Kadarbu" at Hamilton Hill. As of 2012, facilities within the conservation park include car parks at each spring, boardwalks, viewing platforms, and interpretive signage. The conservation park is classified as an IUCN Category III protected area.

See also
Protected areas of South Australia

References

External links
Wabma Kadarbu Mound Springs Conservation Park official webpage
Friends of Mound Springs webpage
Entry for Wabma Kadarbu Mound Springs Conservation Park on Protected Planet

Conservation parks of South Australia
Protected areas established in 1996
1996 establishments in Australia
Co-managed protected areas in South Australia
Far North (South Australia)